{{Infobox election
| election_name      = 2018 Malacca state election
| country            = Malacca
| type               = legislative
| ongoing            = no
| previous_election  = 2013 Malacca state election
| previous_year      = 2013
| previous_mps    = Malaysian State Assembly Representatives (2013-)#Malacca
| next_election      = 2021 Malacca state election
| next_year          = 2021
| next_mps           =
| seats_for_election = All 28 seats of the Malacca State Legislative Assembly
| elected_mps        = Malaysian State Assembly Representatives (2018-)#Malacca
| majority_seats     = 15
| registered         = 494,662
| turnout            = 84.52%
| election_date      = 9 May 2018
| image1             = Adly Zahari.jpg
| image1_size        = 150px
| leader1            = Adly Zahari
| leader_since1      = 30 August 2017
| party1             = AMANAH
| alliance1 = Pakatan Harapan
| colour1            = E21118  
| leaders_seat1      = Bukit Katil
| last_election1     = 6 seats, 31.18%  (Pakatan Rakyat)   	
| seats_needed1      =  12
| seats_before1      = 3
| seat_change1       = 12
| seats1             = 15
| popular_vote1      = 211,153
| percentage1        = 51.1%
| swing1             = 19.9%
| image2             = IdrisHaron.jpg
| image2_size        = 150px
| leader2            = Idris Haron
| leader_since2      = 2013
| party2             = UMNO
| alliance2 = Barisan Nasional
| color2             = 000080 
| leaders_seat2      = Sungai Udang
| last_election2     = 21 seats, 53.31% 
| seats_needed2      = | seats_before2      = 21
| seat_change2       = 8
| seats2             = 13
| popular_vote2      = 156,318
| percentage2        = 37.8%
| swing2             = 15.5%

| image3             =  GS
| image3_size        = 150px
| leader3            = Kamarudin Sidek
| leader_since3      = Unknown
| party3             = PAS
| alliance3 = Gagasan Sejahtera 
| colour3            = 009000
| leaders_seat3      = Duyong
| last_election3     = 1 seat, 14.98%   (Pakatan Rakyat)
| seats_needed3      =  14
| seats_before3      = 1
| seat_change3       = 1
| seats3             = 0
| popular_vote3      = 44,537
| percentage3        = 10.8%
| swing3             = 4.2%

| title            = Chief Minister
| before_election  = Idris Haron
| before_party     = Barisan Nasional
| after_election   = Adly Zahari
| after_party      = Pakatan Harapan
| map_image        = 
| map_size         =
| map_caption      =
}}
The 14th Malacca election''' was held on 9 May 2018 to elect the State Assemblymen of the 14th Malacca State Legislative Assembly, the legislature of the Malaysian state of Malacca. The Malacca State Legislative Assembly dissolved on 7 April 2018 by the Head of State (Yang di-Pertua Negeri of Malacca) on the advice of the Head of Government (Chief Minister of Malacca).

The election was conducted by the Malaysian Election Commission (EC) and utilised the first-past-the-post system. Electoral candidates were nominated on 28 April. On 9 May, between 8.00 a.m. and 5.00 p.m. Malaysian time (UTC+8), polling was held in all 28 state constituencies throughout Malacca; each constituency elects a single State Assemblyman to the state legislature. The election was held concurrently with the 2018 Malaysian general election.

In a historic result, Barisan Nasional (BN), the ruling coalition in Malacca was ousted from power by Pakatan Harapan (PH). Since the first Malacca state election in 1955, BN or its predecessor Alliance had never lost the state election. PH won 15 seats in the election, gaining a simple majority, while BN won 13. Adly Zahari from PH's component party AMANAH was sworn in as new Chief Minister on 11 May 2018.

Background 
The upcoming state election will be the 14th state election in the State of Malacca since the independence of Malaya (now Malaysia) in 1957.

A state election must be held within sixty days after the dissolution. Accordingly, the Election Commission set 28 April as the nomination day and 9 May as the polling day.

Political parties 
Barisan Nasional (BN), the ruling coalition in Malacca, has been in power since its formation and led by Chief Minister Idris Haron.

BN was challenged by two opposition coalitions, the Pakatan Harapan (PH) and the Gagasan Sejahtera (GS). The PH and GS coalitions were led by Adly Zahari and Kamarudin Sidek respectively.

Electoral candidates

Note: 1Four Independent candidates who had quit DAP Malacca to form 'Justice League' informal Independent bloc and contested using the key symbol.

Election pendulum
The 14th General Election witnessed 15 governmental seats and 13 non-governmental seats filled the Malacca State Legislative Assembly. The government side has 4 safe seats and 1 fairly safe seat, while the non-government side has just 2 fairly safe seats.

Results

By parliamentary constituency
Pakatan Harapan won 4 of 6 parliamentary constituency.

Seats that changed allegiance

Aftermath

The state government led by Adly only lasts 22 months, when in the wake of 2020 Malaysian political crisis and defection of several MLA resulted in his resignation and a new state government under BN's Sulaiman Md Ali in March 2020. That government, in turn only lasted another 19 months before another constitutional crisis resulted in a snap election called by Sulaiman in October 2021.

References

Malacca state elections
Malacca
Malacca